The 530s decade ran from January 1, 530, to December 31, 539.

Significant people

Belisarius

Notes

References

Bibliography